Shaheen Monwara Haque is a Bangladesh Awami League politician and the former Member of the Bangladesh Parliament from a reserved seat.

Early life
Haque was born on 23 September 1956. She has a H.S.C. degree.

Career
Haque was elected to parliament from reserved seat as a Bangladesh Awami League candidate in 2009. he was a member of the Standing Committee on the Ministry of Information.

References

Awami League politicians
Living people
Women members of the Jatiya Sangsad
9th Jatiya Sangsad members
21st-century Bangladeshi women politicians
21st-century Bangladeshi politicians
7th Jatiya Sangsad members
1956 births